The Emmett Miller House was a historic house in rural White County, Arkansas.  It was located on the west side of Arkansas Highway 13, north of Judsonia and east of Plainview.  It was a single-story wood-frame structure, with a gabled roof that had exposed rafters and Craftsman brackets in the end gables.  Its front porch, also gabled, had similar features.  It was built in 1938, and was the best example of Craftsman architecture in the Plainview area.

The house was listed on the National Register of Historic Places in 1992.  It has been listed as demolished in the Arkansas Historic Preservation Program database.

See also
National Register of Historic Places listings in White County, Arkansas

References

Houses on the National Register of Historic Places in Arkansas
Houses completed in 1938
Houses in White County, Arkansas
National Register of Historic Places in White County, Arkansas
1938 establishments in Arkansas
Bungalow architecture in Arkansas
American Craftsman architecture in Arkansas